Robert W. Rust (born August 16, 1928), is a politician in the American state of Florida. He served in the Florida House of Representatives from 1966 to 1968, representing the 80th district.

References

1928 births
Living people
Members of the Florida House of Representatives